I Am Slave is a 2010 television film produced for Channel 4 on the story of one woman's fight for freedom from modern-day slavery. It premiered on Channel 4 on 30 August 2010. The movie is mostly based on the experiences of Mende Nazer, a Sudanese author, human rights activist and a former slave in Sudan and London.

Selected cast
 Wunmi Mosaku - Malia
 Isaach De Bankolé - Bah
 Lubna Azabal - Halima
 Yigal Naor - Said
 Hiam Abbass -
 Nonso Anozie -
Nyokabi Gethaiga - Hana
Nasser Memarzia - Ibrahim
Selva Rasalingam - Amir
Amaar Sardharwalla - Assi
Jameel Sardharwalla - Rami

See also
 List of films featuring slavery

References

External links

2010 television films
2010 films
2010s crime drama films
British crime drama films
Films about slavery
Films set in London
2010s English-language films
2010s British films
British drama television films